Zagnut is a candy bar produced and sold in the United States. Its main ingredients are peanut butter and toasted coconut.

History
The Zagnut bar was launched in 1930, by the D. L. Clark Company of western Pennsylvania, which also made the Clark bar. Clark changed its name to the Pittsburgh Food & Beverage company and was acquired by Leaf International in 1983. The Zagnut brand was later part of an acquisition by Hershey Foods Corporation in 1996.

Bon Appétit, in a story about nostalgic candy, said, "We’re honestly flummoxed that Zagnuts aren’t more popular." Conversely, a columnist in The Des Moines Register compared it to a Rose Art crayon, saying "No one would ever purposely choose a Zagnut."

See also
Coconut candy

References

External links 
 

Candy bars
The Hershey Company brands
Peanut butter confectionery
Products introduced in 1930
Foods containing coconut